Holzman is a surname. Notable people with the surname include:

Adam Holzman (guitarist) (born 1960), American classical guitarist
Adam Holzman (keyboardist) (born 1958), American jazz keyboardist
Eli Holzman (born 1974), American creator–developer, writer, and producer
Helene Holzman (1891–1968), German painter and author
Jac Holzman (born 1931), the founder, chief executive officer and head of both Elektra Records and Nonesuch Records
Jacquelin Holzman (born 1936), mayor of Ottawa, Canada, from 1991 to 1997
Liz Holzman (1953–2014), American film producer and director
Malcolm Holzman (born 1940), American architect and founding partner of Holzman Moss Bottino Architecture
Philip Holzman (1922–2004), the Esther and Sidney R. Rabb Professor of Psychology at Harvard University
Red Holzman (1920–1998), NBA Hall of Fame basketball player and coach
Shimshon Holzman (born 1907), Israeli landscape and figurative painter
Winnie Holzman (born 1954), American dramatist, screenwriter and poet

See also
David Holzman's Diary, 1967 American film, directed by Jim McBride, which spoofs the art of documentary-making
Holzmann